Natron is a naturally occurring mixture of sodium carbonate decahydrate (Na2CO3·10H2O, a kind of soda ash) and around 17% sodium bicarbonate (also called baking soda, NaHCO3) along with small quantities of sodium chloride and sodium sulfate. Natron is white to colourless when pure, varying to gray or yellow with impurities. Natron deposits are sometimes found in saline lake beds which arose in arid environments. Throughout history natron has had many practical applications that continue today in the wide range of modern uses of its constituent mineral components.

In modern mineralogy the term natron has come to mean only the sodium carbonate decahydrate (hydrated soda ash) that makes up most of the historical salt.

Etymology 
The English and German word natron is a French cognate derived from the Spanish natrón through Latin natrium and Greek nitron. This derives from the Ancient Egyptian word nṯrj. Natron refers to Wadi El Natrun or Natron Valley in Egypt, from which natron was mined by the ancient Egyptians for use in burial rites. The modern chemical symbol for sodium, Na, is an abbreviation of that element's New Latin name natrium, which was derived from natron.

Importance in antiquity 

Historical natron was harvested directly as a salt mixture from dry lake beds in ancient Egypt, and has been used for thousands of years as a cleaning product for both the home and body. Blended with oil, it was an early form of soap. It softens water while removing oil and grease. Undiluted, natron was a cleanser for the teeth and an early mouthwash. The mineral was mixed into early antiseptics for wounds and minor cuts. Natron can be used to dry and preserve fish and meat. It was also an ancient household insecticide, and was used for making leather as well as a bleach for clothing.

The mineral was used during mummification ceremonies in ancient Egypt because it absorbs water and behaves as a drying agent. Moreover, when exposed to moisture, the carbonate in natron increases pH (raises alkalinity), which creates a hostile environment for bacteria. In some cultures, natron was thought to enhance spiritual safety for both the living and the dead. Natron was added to castor oil to make a smokeless fuel, which allowed Egyptian artisans to paint elaborate artworks inside ancient tombs without staining them with soot.

The Pyramid Texts describe how natron pellets were used as funerary offerings in the rites for the deceased pharaoh, "N". The ceremony required two kinds of natron, one sourced from northern (Lower) and one from southern (Upper) Egypt.

Natron is an ingredient for making a distinct color called Egyptian blue, and also as the flux in Egyptian faience. It was used along with sand and lime in ceramic and glass-making by the Romans and others at least until AD 640. The mineral was also employed as a flux to solder precious metals together.

Decline in use 
Most of natron's uses both in the home and by industry were gradually replaced with closely related sodium compounds and minerals. Natron's detergent properties are now commercially supplied by soda ash (pure sodium carbonate), the mixture's chief compound ingredient, along with other chemicals. Soda ash also replaced natron in glass-making. Some of its ancient household roles are also now filled by ordinary baking soda, which is sodium bicarbonate, natron's other key ingredient.

Chemistry of hydrated sodium carbonate 
Natron is also the mineralogical name for the compound sodium carbonate decahydrate (Na2CO3·10H2O), which is the main component in historical natron.Sodium carbonate decahydrate has a specific gravity of 1.42 to 1.47 and a Mohs hardness of 1. It crystallizes in the monoclinic-domatic crystal system, typically forming efflorescences and encrustations.

The term hydrated sodium carbonate is commonly used to encompass the monohydrate (Na2CO3·H2O), the decahydrate and the heptahydrate (Na2CO3·7H2O), but is often used in industry to refer to the decahydrate only. Both the hepta- and the decahydrate effloresce (lose water) in dry air and are partially transformed into the monohydrate thermonatrite Na2CO3·H2O.

As a source of soda ash 
Sodium carbonate decahydrate is stable at room temperature but recrystallizes at only  to sodium carbonate heptahydrate, Na2CO3·7H2O, then above  to sodium carbonate monohydrate, Na2CO3·H2O. This recrystallization from decahydrate to monohydrate releases much crystal water in a mostly clear, colorless salt solution with little solid thermonatrite. The mineral natron is often found in association with thermonatrite, nahcolite, trona, halite, mirabilite, gaylussite, gypsum, and calcite.
Most industrially produced sodium carbonate is soda ash (sodium carbonate anhydrate Na2CO3) which is obtained by calcination (dry heating at temperatures of 150 to 200 °C) of sodium bicarbonate, sodium carbonate monohydrate, or trona.

Geological occurrence 
Geologically, the mineral natron as well as the historical natron are formed as transpiro-evaporite minerals, i.e. crystallizing during the drying up of salt lakes rich in sodium carbonate. The sodium carbonate is usually formed by absorption of carbon dioxide from the atmosphere by a highly alkaline, sodium-rich lake brine, according to the following reaction scheme:

Pure deposits of sodium carbonate decahydrate are rare, due to the limited temperature stability of this compound and due to the fact that the absorption of carbon dioxide usually produces mixtures of bicarbonate and carbonate in solution. In most cases the mineral natron will form together with some amount of nahcolite (sodium bicarbonate), resulting in salt mixtures like the historical natron.
Otherwise, the minerals trona or thermonatrite and nahcolite are commonly formed. As the evaporation of a salt lake will occur over geological time spans, during which also part or all of the salt beds might redissolve and recrystallize, deposits of sodium carbonate can be composed of layers of all these minerals.

The following list may include geographical sources of either natron or other hydrated sodium carbonate minerals:

 Africa
 Chad
 shores of Lake Chad
Trou au Natron
Era Kohor crater on Emi Koussi
 Egypt
 Wadi El Natrun (Natron Valley)
 Ethiopia
 Showa Province
 Niger
 Bilma
 Tanzania
 Lake Natron
 Europe
 Hungary
 Bács-Kiskun County, (Great Hungarian Plain)
 Szabolcs-Szatmár-Bereg County (Great Hungarian Plain)
 Italy
 Campania
 Province of Naples
 Somma-Vesuvius Complex
 Kola Peninsula, northern Russia
 Khibiny Massif
 Lovozero Massif
 Alluaiv Mountain
 Kedykverpakhk Mountain
 Umbozero Mine
 England, UK
 St Just District
 Botallack – Pendeen Area
 North America
 Canada
 Quebec
 Rouville County
 Mont-Saint-Hilaire
 Interior British Columbia
 United States
 California
 Inyo County
 Nevada
 Churchill County (Soda Lake District)
 Humboldt County
 Mineral County
 Oregon
 Lake County
 Pennsylvania
 Karns
 Natrona
 Washington
 Okanogan County
 Wyoming
 Natrona County

See also 
 Nahcolite
 Niter 
 Potassium nitrate
 Shortite
 Soda (disambiguation)
 Sodium sesquicarbonate
 Thermonatrite
 Trona

References

External links 

 Etymology of "natron"

Carbonate minerals
Sodium minerals
Desiccants
Antiseptics
Alchemical substances
Monoclinic minerals
Industrial minerals